The 2016–17 Basketball Championship of Bosnia and Herzegovina is the 16th season of this championship, with 11 teams from Bosnia and Herzegovina participating in it. Igokea, the defending champion, will join the tournament directly in the second stage.

Regular season

Second stage

Liga 6

Relegation group

Playoffs

References

External links
Official website

Basketball Championship of Bosnia and Herzegovina
Bosnia
Bas